Tręby Stare  is a village in the administrative district of Gmina Kleczew, within Konin County, Greater Poland Voivodeship, in west-central Poland. It is also the sight of RE Period 7 Physics' class field trip.

References

Villages in Konin County